Hain is a community in the Jirapa District in the Upper West Region of Ghana. The residents of Hain celebrate the Tinmaale Festival.

Institutions 

 Baalayele Company
 Hain Police Station
 Ghana National Fire Station, Hain
 Hain District Assembly Basic Schools
 Hain Polyclinic

References 

Upper West Region
Communities in Ghana
Populated places in the Upper West Region